Anne DeMarinis is an American musician and artist. She is a former member of Sonic Youth.

Sonic Youth 

Anne DeMarinis was in the alternative rock band Sonic Youth, for a very brief period in 1981 as a keyboardist. She contributed vocals, along with Kim Gordon, and Thurston Moore, on three (known) Sonic Youth songs performed once, and only live on June 18, 1981. The songs are entitled "Noisefest #1", "Noisefest #2", and "Noisefest #3". She also played guitar at that same show on the song entitled "Noisefest #4". She left the band before their self-titled debut EP was recorded in December 1981.

Other works 

DeMarinis has also designed album covers.

In 1981, she appeared on the Just Another Asshole compilation. Many of her other band mates from Sonic Youth appear on that album as well.
Anne also appears on Glenn Branca's instrumental album Symphony No. 1.  She is credited for keyboards, and percussion and as a co-producer. Thurston Moore, and Lee Ranaldo also appear on this album.
In 1981 she also founded the band Interference with David Linton and Michael Brown.
She also appears on Ten Roir Years, Thurston Moore and Lee Ranaldo appear on this album as well.
She also works with Laurie Anderson on her album's United States Live, and Talk Normal: The Laurie Anderson Anthology.
She appears on the cover compilation album Live at the Knitting Factory: Downtown Does the Beatles, she plays the accordion on this album.

In 1993, she plays accordion Kurt Hoffman's Band of Weeds.
She plays accordion on the album Dot by George Cartwright.

In 1994, she is credited for playing accordion on the album To All My Friends in Far-Flung Places by Dave Van Ronk.
She is credited on two of Robert Een's albums Big Joe (1995), and Mr.Jealousy (1998).
Anne is credited as the "Art Director" on Michael Davis' album Trumpets Eleven, and on his album Brass Nation.
She plays the accordion, and is also the art director on the album Smoke and Mirrors by Steven Elson.

In 2006, she appears on Dave Soldier's Chamber Music CD.

References

External links
Sonic Youth Song Info
Glenn Branca: Symphony No. 1 info
Band Of Weeds Info
Anne Info

American rock keyboardists
American women guitarists
Living people
Sonic Youth members
Noise rock musicians
Year of birth missing (living people)
Place of birth missing (living people)